Seize the Day, first published in 1956, is Saul Bellow's fourth novel. It was adapted into the film of the same name.

Synopsis
The story centers on a day in the life of Wilhelm Adler (a.k.a. Tommy Wilhelm), a failed actor in his forties. He is poor, unemployed and separated from his wife (who refuses to agree to a divorce). He is also estranged from his children and his father, a highly regarded former doctor who lives in the same Broadway building.

Wilhelm is immature and lacks insight, which has brought him to failure.

In Seize the Day Wilhelm experiences a day of reckoning as he is forced to examine his life and to accept the "burden of self."

References

1956 American novels
Novels by Saul Bellow
American novellas
Viking Press books
Unemployment in fiction
American novels adapted into films
Novels set in one day